

Etymology 
Nahia is a Basque female name meaning "aspiration" / "wish" / "desire".

Pronunciation 
 Nahia

Usage 
The Basque Statistics Office cited it as the 5th most popular given name for baby girls born in the Basque Country between 2010 and 2012.

Outside the Basque Country, specially in Spain, the name of Naia is a more frequent given name and while, in Spanish they are pronounced similarly, they have different etymologies; Naia has instead a Greek mythological origin.

Other forms 
Variants of Nahia are:
 Nahikari
 Gure
 Since it is pronounced similarly, Naia is sometimes considered as a variant of Nahia when one prefers to consider its origin as Greek rather than Basque.

Notes

Given names